David D'Apuzzo (born 5 September 1988) is an Australian footballer.

Career
Until December 2009, he was contracted as a left back for the A-League club Central Coast Mariners.

D'Apuzzo left his contract with the Central Coast Mariners to focus on studying for a law degree. He re-signed with APIA Leichhardt for the 2010 NSW Premier League season.

Personal life
D'Apuzzo is also the brother of former Newcastle Jets midfielder Adam D'Apuzzo. He formerly attended Trinity Grammar School in Summer Hill, Sydney, Australia with both his brother and former Sydney FC striker Ben Vidaic.

References

External links
 Central Coast Mariners profile 

1988 births
Australia youth international soccer players
Australian people of Italian descent
A-League Men players
Central Coast Mariners FC players
People educated at Trinity Grammar School (New South Wales)
Soccer players from Sydney
Living people
Association football wingers
National Premier Leagues players
Association football fullbacks
Australian soccer players